Ann. Phys. can refer to several physics journals
Annals of Physics, abbreviated Ann. Phys. (N. Y.), the American journal published by Elsevier
Annalen der Physik, abbreviated  Ann. Phys. (Leipzig) before 2008 or Ann. Phys. (Berl.) after 2008, the German journal published by Wiley-VCH
Annales de Physique, abbreviated  Ann. Phys. (Paris), the French journal that became European Physical Journal H in 2010

Not to be confused with:
Anales de Física, abbreviated  An. Fís., the Spanish journal published by the Royal Spanish Society of Physics